Autoroute 85 is a Quebec Autoroute and the route of the Trans-Canada Highway in the province's Bas-Saint-Laurent region, also known as Autoroute Claude-Béchard. It is currently under construction with committed Federal and Provincial funding for its completion, with an estimated completion date of 2026. Once this upgrade is completed, it will close the last gap in the nearly continuous freeway section of the Trans-Canada between Arnprior, Ontario, and Sutherlands River, Nova Scotia, and for an even longer interprovincial freeway route between Windsor, Ontario and Halifax, Nova Scotia. Running between Rivière-du-Loup (at a junction with Autoroute 20) and a junction with New Brunswick Route 2 at the Quebec-New Brunswick border, A-85 when complete will be the only controlled access highway link between the Maritime Provinces and the rest of the country.

Currently there are two completed sections of A-85. The first section runs from Saint-Antonin (km 87) to a junction with the A-20 at Notre-Dame-du-Portage (km 100). Originally signed as Route 185 when built, it was designed as A-85 in 2005 following extensive rehabilitation. The second, newer section extends from the New Brunswick border (km 0) to Saint-Louis-du-Ha! Ha! (km 48). Construction began in 2002 in the vicinity of Témiscouata-sur-le-Lac and it was completed in 2016. The government of Quebec is currently building the final section from Saint-Antonin to Saint-Louis-du-Ha! Ha!, and it is scheduled to be completed in 2026.

Route description

Southern segment
A-85 begins at the Quebec-New Brunswick border as the continuation of New Brunswick Route 2 and the Trans-Canada Highway. In 2010, the Quebec government announced that A-85 would be named for Claude Béchard, a longtime Member of the National Assembly from Bas-Saint-Laurent.

From the New Brunswick border, A-85 briefly parallels the main runway of the Edmundston Airport, which straddles the interprovincial border. The freeway travels in a northwesterly direction, following the course of the Madawaska River. The autoroute passes Dégelis to the west with exits at km 12, km 14, and km 15. Briefly skirting the south shore of Lake Témiscouata, A-85 passes through Témiscouata-sur-le-Lac, with exits at km 29, km 37, and km 40, providing access to Lac-Témiscouata National Park. At Saint-Louis-du-Ha! Ha! (km 48), the controlled-access highway ends and the route resumes its designation as Route 185.

Northern segment
The second section of A-85 begins in Saint-Antonin with exits at km 89, km 90, and km 93 as it traverses the Great Lakes–St. Lawrence Lowlands. Exit 93 provides access to Route 191 which bypasses Rivière-du-Loup to the south and provides the most direct route for motorists bound for Rimouski, Mont-Joli, and Gaspésie via eastbound A-20. After one last exit (km 97), the A-85 merges with westbound A-20 at the Saint Lawrence River. Westbound A-20 assumes the Trans-Canada Highway designation, continuing on to Québec City and Montréal, then to Windsor via A-20 and Ontario Highway 401, or Ottawa via the A-40 and Ontario Highway 417.

History

The first section of A-85 that was built stretched from km 94 in Rivière-du-Loup to A-20 at km 100. This section opened in 1972 as Route 185.

In 2002, a bypass of Notre-Dame-du-Lac was built, then in 2004, a bypass of Dégelis was constructed.

In 2005, the initial segment saw an extension south to km 88 in Saint-Antonin. The freeway was officially signed as A-85 from km 88 to km 100 in anticipation of the conversion of Route 185.

In 2009, bypasses of Cabano and Saint-Louis-du-Ha! Ha! opened, and in 2011, those bypasses were connected.

In 2013, the bypass of Dégelis was extended both ways, with the new freeway stretching from km 8 to km 22. It would be extended further south and tied into New Brunswick Route 2 in 2014.

Also in 2014, the Notre-Dame-du-Lac and Cabano bypasses were connected, and then in 2015, the freeway was extended to km 48.

In 2021 and 2022, the initial segment saw further extension south, with the new freeway stretching from km 76 to km 100. Another separate segment was constructed between km 56 and km 62. The entire freeway is meant to be connected by 2026.

Exit list

References

External links

Transport Quebec website
Transports Quebec Map 
A-85 at motorways-exits.com
A-85 at Quebec Autoroutes
Press release on A-85 opening

85
Quebec 085
Roads in Bas-Saint-Laurent
Transport in Rivière-du-Loup